Arvid Fladmoe (May 8, 1915 – November 18, 1993) was a Norwegian composer and conductor. He was particularly known for his work as conductor of opera and operetta.

Background
Arvid Emil Fladmoe was born in Oslo, Norway.  His parents were Victor Emil Fladmoe (died 1957) and Valborg Fladmoe (1892-1971).  He trained with Carl Flesch at the Royal Academy of Music  in London. He also studied with Max Rostal in Oslo.

Career
His solo debut as a violinist took place during November 1933 in the Ceremony Hall of the University of Oslo (Universitetets Aula). In 1938, he was appointed concertmaster of the  Bergen Philharmonic Orchestra where he stayed for two years. During World War II,  he taught at the  Barratt Dues  Music Institute which had been  founded and was operated by his wife's parents,  Mary Louise Barratt Due (1888–1969) and Henrik Adam Due (1891-1966).

On 20 February 1944, Flame was aboard the ferry D/F Hydro when it was sunk in a commando operation. The Hydro was carrying heavy water that would have been used in Nazi Germany's nuclear weapons programme.

In 1945, Fladmoe made his debut as conductor of the National Theatre in Oslo and continued until there until 1959, except for the 1947–48 seasons where he was conductor of the Trondheim Symphony Orchestra. He conducted both the Oslo Philharmonic Orchestra and the Bergen Philharmonic Orchestra and was principal conductor in Bergen from 1958 until 1961. He was the first musical director at the Norwegian National Opera from 1961 to 1973. He also served as professor at Norwegian Academy of Music.

Arvid Fladmoe wrote numerous compositions for voice, for orchestra and several chamber works. 
In 1966, Fladmoe  was  made a Knight first Class of the Royal Norwegian Order of St. Olav. In 1973, he also received the King's Medal of Merit in gold.

Works

Solo voice 
Barcarole (baritone and orchestra)
Besvergelse (baritone and string quartet)
Bukkerittet (2 voices and orchestra)
Et Barn (voice and piano
Kannarhaugene (1984) (baritone and orchestra)
Sanger om døden (1990) (soprano, violin, viola and cello)
Svana eld fra "På Kannarhaugene" (voice, string quartet)
Tre sange (baritone and orchestra)
Tre sanger (1985) (soprano, violin, viola and cello)

Orchestral works
Caprice (1984) (oboe solo and orchestra)
Musikk for cello og orkester
Musikk for orkester (1984)
Musikk for strykere (1981) (string orchestra)
Suite for orkester
Suite (1984-1986) (orchestra)

Chamber music
Divertimento (flute, clarinet and bassoon)
Kvartettsats (string quartet)
Liten trio (1976) (flute, clarinet and bassoon)
Musikk for strykekvartett
Preludium (string quartet)

References

External links
Barratt Dues  Music Institute

1915 births
1993 deaths
Academic staff of the Norwegian Academy of Music
Norwegian classical composers
Norwegian conductors (music)
Male conductors (music)
Musicians from Bergen
Recipients of the King's Medal of Merit in gold
20th-century classical composers
Norwegian male classical composers
20th-century conductors (music)
20th-century Norwegian male musicians